Empis hyalipennis  is a species of fly in the family Empididae. It is included in the subgenus Coptophlebia of the genus Empis. It is found in the  Palearctic.

References

Empis
Insects described in 1816
Asilomorph flies of Europe